Amber Tysiak (born 26 January 2000) is a Belgian footballer who plays as a defender for Women's Super League club West Ham United and the Belgium national team.

Early life
Tysiak was born in Houthalen-Helchteren and is of Italian / Polish descent.
She started playing football around the age of 5, with the boys at KFC Helson (Helchteren).

Club career
After playing four seasons with Genk, Tysiak transferred to Oud-Heverlee Leuven in April 2020.

In January 2023, Tysiak joined English Women's Super League club West Ham United.

International career
Tysiak first got called up for a Belgium U16 international match on November 28, 2015 for a friendly game against Germany. She subsequently became a regular at youth games and captained the U19 squad during the 2019 U19 EURO in Scotland.

Tysiak made her debut for the Belgium national team on 18 February 2021, in a 6–1 friendly defeat by the Netherlands at King Baudouin Stadium in Brussels.

She scored her first goal, and her first hattrick, for the senior national team on 25 November 2021, during a 19–0 record win against Armenia as part of the 2023 FIFA Women's World Cup qualification campaign.

Personal life
Tysiak has a bachelor’s degree in secondary education teaching. Originally she combined football with a job as a teacher. At the start of the 2022/23 season she put her job on hold and plays full-time at OH Leuven and the national team.She has a brother who is three years her senior.

Career statistics

Scores and results list Belgium's goal tally first, score column indicates score after each Tysiak goal.

References

External links 
 
 

2000 births
Living people
Belgian women's footballers
Women's association football defenders
Belgium women's international footballers
KRC Genk Ladies players
Oud-Heverlee Leuven (women) players
West Ham United F.C. Women players
Super League Vrouwenvoetbal players
Belgian people of Polish descent
UEFA Women's Euro 2022 players
Belgium women's youth international footballers
Belgian people of Italian descent